F. Sue Chandler, known as Sue (or Suzanne) Chandler, is a British schoolteacher and textbook writer, who, together with co-author Linda Bostock, wrote the "Bostock and Chandler" series of textbooks for advanced level mathematics in the UK. At the time she began the series, she was a full-time mathematics teacher at Southgate Technical College in Southgate, London. She eventually stopped teaching courses and focused on textbook writing. Her books have sold more than 6 million copies.

Selected publications
Textbooks

Other
.

References

Year of birth missing (living people)
Living people
Mathematics education in the United Kingdom
Mathematics educators